Beaver Township is a township in Cowley County, Kansas, USA.  As of the 2000 census, its population was 244.

Geography
According to the USGS, it contains two cemeteries: Memorial Lawn and Tannehill.

The streams of Beaver Creek, Beaver Creek and Slate Creek run through this township.

Transportation
Beaver Township contains one airport or landing strip, Strother Field.

References
 USGS Geographic Names Information System (GNIS)

External links
 City-Data.com

Townships in Cowley County, Kansas
Townships in Kansas